The 12349 / 12350 Bhagalpur–New Delhi Weekly Superfast Express is a Superfast train of the Indian Railways connecting  in Bihar and  of Delhi. It is currently being operated with 12349/12350 train numbers on a weekly basis.

Service

12349/Bhagalpur–New Delhi Weekly Superfast Express has average speed of 76 km/h and covers 1220 km in 21 hours 30 minutes. 12350/New Delhi–Bhagalpur Weekly Superfast Express has average speed of 73 km/hr and covers 1220 km in 21 hrs 55 minutes.
Previously this train was running via Patna Junction but from 18 March 2019 it is running via Gaya Junction. Instead of 17:30 hrs the train departed Bhagalpur junction at 15:30 hrs because time table of this train is changed from Bhagalpur Junction to Pandit Deen Dayal Upadhyay Junction. Also, it is running with LHB coach from 18 March from Bhagalpur Junction to New Delhi.

Route & Halts 

The important halts of this train are:

 
  
 
 
 
 
 
 
 
 
 
 Note:- 12350 has no stoppage at Sultanganj.

Coach composition

The train has Advanced LHB rakes with max speed of 160 km/h. The train consists of 22 LHB coach:

 2 AC II Tier
 3 AC III Tier
 11 sleeper coaches
 4 general
 2 EOGs

Traction

Both trains are hauled by a Howrah-based WAP-7 electric locomotive from Bhagalpur to New Delhi and vice versa.

Rake sharing 

The train shares its rake with 13423/13424 Bhagalpur–Ajmer Express.

See also 

 Bhagalpur Junction railway station
 New Delhi railway station
 Bhagalpur–Ajmer Express

Notes

External links 

 12349/Bhagalpur - New Delhi Weekly SF Express
 12350/New Delhi - Bhagalpur Weekly SF Express

References 

Transport in Bhagalpur
Transport in Delhi
Express trains in India
Rail transport in Bihar
Rail transport in Uttar Pradesh
Rail transport in Delhi